Rick Comley (born January 20, 1947) is a former collegiate ice hockey player and former head coach at Michigan State University. He finished his 38-year coaching career with a 783–615–110 (.556) record. In 2007, he became the third coach in NCAA history to win a national championship at two different schools. Comley is currently serving in his second stint as the athletic director at Northern Michigan University, hired in 2022.

Playing career
Comley played at Lake Superior State University in Sault Ste. Marie, Michigan (1967–1971) under head coach Ron Mason, at one time, college hockey's career coaching victories leader.  In his senior season, Comley was named LSSU team captain and Most Valuable Player and was selected NAIA All-American.  He was also named LSSU's Most Outstanding Athlete that year.

Coaching career

Lake Superior State
Comley rejoined the LSSU program as an assistant coach for the 1972-73 season.  When head coach Ron Mason took the head coaching position at Bowling Green State University, Comley was named his successor.  Comley compiled a 59-46-3 mark in the three seasons at Lake Superior winning the CCHA regular-season title and NAIA national championship in 1974.

Northern Michigan
In 1976, Northern Michigan University launched a varsity hockey program, and approached Comley to become its first head coach.  NMU's offer included a recruiting budget twice the size of LSSU, which was too much for Comley to resist. NMU finished its first season with a winning record of 19-13-1. In the program's fourth season, Comley guided NMU to their first of two consecutive CCHA regular-season and play-off championships. With those championships in 1980 and 1981, Northern Michigan earned automatic bids to the NCAA Tournament. The 34-6-1 1980 team defeated University of Minnesota in Minneapolis advancing to the NCAA Frozen Four where they defeated No. 1 seed Cornell University to make the national championship game. The team lost the national championship to North Dakota, 5-2. Again, Comley guided NMU to the NCAA Frozen Four in 1981 with a victory over Cornell before losing to eventual national champion Wisconsin and archrival Michigan Tech in the consolation game.

In 1984 Comley and Northern Michigan followed Michigan Tech to the Western Collegiate Hockey Association. In the WCHA, Comley coached NMU to seven 20-win seasons in nine years. He won the WCHA MacNaughton Cup as regular-season champions in 1991 and won the Broadmoor Trophy as play-off champions in 1989, 1991 and 1992. During Northern Michigan's time in the WCHA, the Wildcats made the NCAA tournament in 1989, 1991, 1992 and 1993 winning the 1991 NCAA national championship in a dramatic triple overtime game against Boston University.

In a university-wide effort to gain more presence in the lower peninsula of Michigan, Comley switched NMU's hockey program back to the CCHA in 1997. The move proved to re-energize hockey at Northern Michigan which had three straight losing seasons prior to 1997-98. Comley coached NMU to five straight winning seasons and three trips to Joe Louis Arena for the CCHA championships. In 1999, Northern Michigan made the CCHA title game, but lost to University of Michigan. The championship appearance earned Comley and NMU their first berth in the NCAA tournament since 1993.

During his time at NMU, Comley also served as athletic director from 1987-2000 highlighted by: major improvements in facilities including the building and completion of Superior Dome and Berry Events Center, several Great Lakes Intercollegiate Athletic Conference championships, two NCAA Division II titles in women's volleyball, and the establishment of the U.S. Olympic Educational Center.

Michigan State
Rick Comley was announced as Ron Mason's successor as head ice hockey coach at Michigan State University in March 2002. Comley was succeeded at NMU by former player and New York Rangers assistant Walt Kyle. Previously, Comley declined head coaching offers at Bowling Green State University in 1979 and 1994 and at University of Denver in 1994.

Comley's tenure at MSU was turbulent replacing the iconic Ron Mason. After missing the NCAA tournament in 2005, Comley guided MSU to a second-place CCHA finish and a CCHA play-off championship in 2005-06. In 2006-07, Michigan State was preseason ranked No. 5, which was MSU's highest preseason ranking since October 2001. The team was, again, inconsistent but earned an NCAA Tournament bid. In a stunning series of games, MSU defeated three higher-ranked teams en route to the national championship, including wins against No. 1-ranked Notre Dame in the Midwest Regional final and No. 4-ranked Boston College in the National Championship game.

Comley retired at the end of the 2010-2011 season. He was succeeded by Tom Anastos.

Administrative Career
After previously serving in the role while still the hockey head coach from 1987-2000, Comley was rehired as the athletic director at Northern Michigan University in 2022 after the previous director, Forrest Karr, left to accept the same position at the University of Minnesota Duluth.

Legacy
Rick Comley is one of only five coaches to have won more than 700 games, and one of only three to have won NCAA Championships at two separate schools. Comley was the CCHA coach of the year twice (1980 and 1981) and WCHA coach of the year twice (1989 and 1991). He has won the Spencer Penrose Memorial Trophy as the national coach of the year twice (1980 and 1991). He was runner-up for the Spencer Penrose Trophy in 2007.

In his 33 seasons as a head coach, Rick Comley coached 1991 Hobey Baker Memorial Award runner-up Brad Werenka and nine Hobey Baker finalists. He has coached 14 AHCA First and Second Team All-Americans, three CCHA players of the year, one WCHA player of the year, 20 First and Second Team All-CCHA selections, 13 First Team and Second Team All-WCHA selection and 19 players who went on to play in the NHL.

In addition Comley has 25 seasons with a winning record, 17 seasons winning 20 or more games and two seasons winning 30 or more games. Comley has won two CCHA regular-season championships, three CCHA play-off titles, one WCHA regular-season title and four WCHA play-off titles. His teams have advanced to the NCAA tournament nine times making the Frozen Four four times.

Notable players coached 
In 38 years of coaching, Rick Comley has coached a number of outstanding players.

Hobey Baker Award finalists

AHCA All-America

Conference Player of the Year

NHL players

Olympians

Head coaching record 

† Lake Superior State was a member of both the CCHA and NAIA for the 1973-74 season.

See also
List of college men's ice hockey coaches with 400 wins

References

External links
 Michigan State profile

1947 births
Lake Superior State Lakers men's ice hockey players
Living people
Michigan State Spartans ice hockey coaches
Sportspeople from Burlington, Ontario
People from Sault Ste. Marie, Michigan
Northern Michigan Wildcats men's ice hockey coaches
Lake Superior State Lakers men's ice hockey coaches
Canadian ice hockey centres